Apocalipsis may refer to:

 Apocalipsis (wrestler), Mexican professional wrestler
 Apocalipsis (video game), 2018 video game


Disambiguation pages